Aaro Ek Prithibi is a 2023 Indian Bengali language drama film directed by Atanu Ghosh. It is produced by Ashok Dhanuka and Himanshu Dhanuka under the banner of Eskay Movies. The film stars an ensemble of Tasnia Farin, Kaushik Ganguly, Anindita Bose and Saheb Bhattacharya.

Cast 

 Tasnia Farin as Pratiksha
 Kaushik Ganguly as Srikanta Munshi
 Anindita Bose as Ayesha 
 Saheb Bhattacharya as Aritra Chatterjee

Release 
The official trailer of the film was released on 9 November 2022. The film was released on 3 February 2023.

References